Ale Kino+ is a Polish television channel owned and operated by Canal+. It is available on the networks of cable television and the digital platform Cyfra+ (now nc+) since 16 April 1999.

It broadcasts 22 hours daily and is exclusively devoted to cinema films and documentaries and interviews. Since July 2008, certain items of programming are broadcast in the 16/9 format and with the option to select a language.

References

External links 
 Official website

Television channels in Poland
Television channels and stations established in 1999
Canal+ Premium
1999 establishments in Poland